Krishna Desai (died 5 June 1970) was a member of the Communist Party of India (CPI).

He was a Member of Legislative Assembly of Maharashtra who represented the working-class Mumbai constituency of Parel, then a communist stronghold. Desai was murdered in 1970, and this was preceded by the burning of the office of the CPI-led Girni Kamgar Union. Hansen considers his murder to be the culmination of the Shiv Sena campaign against the communists. His murder was a sign of a Sena victory in its struggle for the domination of unions and politics in Mumbai's working class district.

Desai was stabbed to death on 5 June 1970. He was a sitting MLA when he was murdered. Seven suspects were arrested on 8 June 1970. Nineteen young persons were charged and sixteen were convicted for the murder. The accused were defended by Ram Jethmalani. Balasaheb Thackeray's complicity in the murder was never proven. Prakash writes that those convicted were members of the Shiv Sena. According to Dipankar Gupta, the Shiv Sena chief Bal Thackeray congratulated those who killed Desai, declaring, "we must not miss a single opportunity to massacre communists wherever we find them."

In the special by-election held in October 1970, his wife Sarojini Desai was nominated by the CPI, but she was defeated by the Shiv Sena candidate Wamanrao Mahadik by a narrow margin of 1679 votes (of the nearly 62000 votes cast).

According to the communists, the then Indian National Congress government had an interest in weakening and driving out the communists, and so it "supported the incident".

See also
 List of assassinated Indian politicians

References

Communist Party of India politicians from Maharashtra
Assassinated Indian politicians
Politicians from Mumbai
1970 deaths
Deaths by stabbing in India
Maharashtra MLAs 1967–1972
Year of birth missing
People murdered in Maharashtra